Stop Me is a 1988 compilation album by the Smiths.

Stop Me may also refer to:

"Stop Me If You Think You've Heard This One Before", a song by the Smiths, 1987; covered by Mark Ronson as "Stop Me", 2007
"Stop Me" (Christon Gray song), 2016
"Stop Me", a song by Chris Cornell from Scream, 2009
"Stop Me", a song by Donna Summer from The Wanderer, 1980
"Stop Me", a song by Natalia Kills from Trouble, 2013
"Stop Me", a song by Patricia Paay, 1987
"Stop Me", a song by Shelby Lynne from Soft Talk, 1991
"Stop Me", a song by the Shirelles, 1958
"Stop Me (If You've Heard it All Before)", a song by Billy Ocean from Billy Ocean, 1976
"Stop Me (Stop You)", a song by Nick Murphy, 2016

See also
 Stop Me If You've Heard This (disambiguation)